The Dirty Dozen: The Fatal Mission is a 1988 made-for-TV film directed by Lee H. Katzin, and is the third sequel to the 1967 film The Dirty Dozen. It features an all-new "dirty dozen", with the exception of the returning Joe Stern, under the leadership of Major Wright (performed by Telly Savalas). The plot concerns Major Wright and his convict commando squad attempting to stop 12 top Nazis, who are trying to organize a Fourth Reich.

Synopsis

Opening
The film opens with Major Wright leading a group of commandos in Nazi-occupied Denmark. The group is on their way to meet up with a "good German," Naval Captain Carl Ludwig. As Ludwig appears through the fog to Major Wright and his men, they are glad to see he's alone, however, he is actually being followed by a German patrol. Realizing that they cannot allow Ludwig to be captured alive, the commandos spring into action. Ludwig is shot by the patrol, as Major Wright and his commandos arrive and kill them. Before he succumbs to his wounds, Ludwig utters the phrase, "vierundzwanzig, zwanzig" (2420), which Major Wright does not understand.

Back in England, Major Wright, Major General Worden (Ernest Borgnine), Lieutenant Carol Campbell (Heather Thomas) and a British Lieutenant Colonel are driving along when they happen upon two American GIs brawling outside a pub. Major Wright has the two men, Fred Collins and Tom Ricketts, arrested, because "they might come in handy on the next mission."

At U.S. Army Headquarters in London, the Colonel and others are seen discussing the Germans' plans for developing a Fourth Reich (in case they lose the war) in the Middle East under the guidance of SS General Kurt Richter who has selected 12 loyal and influential Nazis under age 35 to be transported to Istanbul and build the new Reich over the course of 10 years, 20 years or a century if necessary. The 12 men will be boarding a train in Munich and will travel along the old Orient Express route to Istanbul in neutral Turkey.

Major Wright is ordered to recruit 12 men from Forbes Road Military Prison for a suicide mission aimed at preventing the train from reaching its destination and killing Richter's selected 12 Nazis.

Before making his selections at Forbes Road, Major Wright is joined by Major General Worden, who reveals that SS Gruppenführer Richter's 12 men will be riding in Orient Express train car #2420, which explains Captain Ludwig's words.

Training
Once again, Major Wright is joined by Sergeant Holt, who assists in keeping the 'dirty dozen' in line.

The group is shown practicing their bayonet technique, during which a few of the men display their disdain for the major.

Meanwhile, at SS Headquarters in Berlin, numerous SS officers are shown being briefed by General Richter on the exploits of Major Wright and Richter informs them that he has recruited a new 'dirty dozen' and intends to try to stop the Orient Express from reaching its destination. Richter reveals that this info was supplied by an informant who is close to the situation.

The 'dirty dozen' are to take their first and last training jumps at night due to time constraints. When his turn comes to jump, D'Agostino panics and has to be 'persuaded' out of the plane. The last member of the dozen to jump is Hoffman, however, his chute never opens and he 'bounces.'

The next day, Major Wright brings the Colonel and Lieutenant Campbell out to reveal that upon recovering Hoffman's body, he found that Hoffman's chute had been sabotaged. Having lost his European 'expert,' Campbell volunteers her services to Major Wright, as she had spent her formative years in Europe while her father served as a diplomat and possesses extensive knowledge of various European languages and customs, including Yugoslavia. Major Wright is skeptical at first and tells her of the danger, but he ultimately accepts, making Campbell the first female member of the 'dirty dozen.'

In the film room the rest of the dozen are introduced to Lieutenant Campbell and then go through identifying Richter's 12 and their importance to the Fourth Reich mission. Afterwards, the dozen are supposed to view a film on Nazi-occupied Yugoslavia, however, that film was switched with a blue film.

On their final day of training, the 'dirty dozen' undergo a train jumping exercise, which involves them staying out of sight and then dropping down onto a train from bridge supports. When the dozen completes this successfully, Major Wright knows they are ready, and rewards them with a final night of drunken debauchery and female companionship. As the men celebrate, General Worden and the Colonel arrive, which we learn was at Major Wright's request. The major reveals that he believes there is a traitor in the 'dirty dozen' who is feeding information to the Germans. Both General Worden and (particularly) the Colonel want to abort the mission, but Major Wright talks them out of it, saying down the line he'll figure out who the traitor is and get rid of him.

Mission
Major Wright, figuring the Germans will be waiting at the drop zone, orders the pilots to drop the 'dirty dozen' some 20 miles away from Skopje. The Yugoslavian Resistance Fighters who were stationed at the original drop zone are surrounded by the SS and shot. One is "allowed" to survive for "interrogation purposes."

In Skopje, Major Wright and Demchuk don civilian clothes and go to the apartment of Resistance leader Yelena Voskovic where they are greeted suspiciously due to the disappearance of the Resistance fighters sent to meet the dozen at the drop zone. Major Wright is able to defuse the tenuous situation and the 'dirty dozen' and the Resistance fighters band together.

Meanwhile, the SS are shown torturing the lone surviving Resistance fighter, who happens to be Yelena's brother. He passes out before giving them any information.

As the dozen and the Resistance group are resting at a farmhouse, Major Wright reveals to a concerned Stern and Hamilton that there is a traitor in the dirty dozen this time, and that's why plans have changed.

Back on the trail, the 'dirty dozen' and the partisans disguise themselves as Macedonian Orthodox mourners transporting a coffin (carrying Hamilton) to cross through a checkpoint. A German guard checks the coffin and is met by machine gun fire from Hamilton and a battle ensues, with the group successfully destroying the checkpoint with only one casualty, Munoz.

Later on, while the group is resting in the woods at night, Major Wright reveals the new attack point - east of Sofia. It is here that Stern and Lieutenant Campbell share a tender moment and kiss.

Back in England at U.S. Army Headquarters, the Colonel informs General Worden that no attack has taken place yet and that he has put the 12th Fighter Command on standby.

Now in Sofia, and dressed as civilians, Major Wright, Demchuk, Yelena and one of her men kill the Bulgarian soldier and an officer, who guards at a major bridge checkpoint. The helmets of the Bulgarian soldiers have the Bulgarian national flag on the right, but the colors are in a wrong order: White on top, green in the middle, red on the bottom. The green and red are switched. The rest of the dozen to get ready for the forthcoming train. Meanwhile, aboard the train, General Richter addresses his 12 men. One of them, Kranz, reveals that Hitler has given him a letter that names Richter as Hitler's successor and leader of the Fourth Reich.

As the train reaches the bridge, the 'dirty dozen' infiltrate it and the battle begins. While heading through the train cars to get to Richter's 12, Hamilton is wounded in the leg. Demchuk makes his way to the locomotive and seizes control of the train. Echevarria is wounded in the shoulder and Wilson and Porter are killed while clearing out the train. Major Wright and Yelena secure the rear, completing total control of the train. With the targets locked in car #2420, Major Wright decides to hold them as hostages instead of killing them.

The Germans (Actually, Bulgarian soldiers, wearing Bulgarian uniforms and speaking Bulgarian language), in an attempt to block the train, move a tanker car in its path, causing Demchuk to bring the train to a screeching halt. Major Wright goes to check the situation and is followed by D'Agostino who decides to "provide cover." Sensing trouble, Major Wright catches D'Agostino placing a grenade on the tanker. After removing the grenade, Major Wright confronts D'Agostino, questions him as to why he would sell out his country and then shoots him. The major then decides to attach the tanker to the front of the train as "insurance."

As the train approaches Dranos, Greece, the Germans set up a road block. Seeing and expecting the road block, Major Wright orders everyone (but Richter's 12) off the train as the Germans, led by Richter, open fire.

In the ensuing battle, Ricketts is mortally wounded and Mitchell is killed while leaping from the train, and Demchuk is killed before he can even exit the locomotive. The train (and tanker), now just carrying Richter's 12 plows through the German road block creating a chain reaction of explosions that destroys the German unit stationed there, General Richter, and the 12 men in car #2420.

Major Wright and the survivors move out to link up with a British submarine in the Aegean Sea and head back to England, however, Yelena opts to go back to Yugoslavia and join up with Tito's partisans because "[her] life is here, always."

Besides Major Wright and Sergeant Holt, the survivors of the 'dirty dozen' are: Joseph Stern, Lieutenant Campbell, Joseph Hamilton, Fred Collins and Roberto Echevarria.

Cast
 Telly Savalas as Major Wright
 Ernest Borgnine as Major General Sam Worden
 Jeff Conaway as Sergeant Holt
 Hunt Block as Joseph Stern
 Matthew Burton as SS-Gruppenführer Kurt Richter
 Alex Cord as Dravko Demchuk
 Erik Estrada as Carmine D'Agostino
 Ernie Hudson as Joseph Hamilton
 Heather Thomas as Lieutenant Carol Campbell
 James Carroll Jordan as Lonnie Wilson
 Natalia Nogulich as Yelena Voskovich
 Ray Mancini as Tom Ricketts
 John Matuszak as Frederick Collins
 Anthony Valentine as Colonel Clark
 Richard Yniguez as Roberto Echevarria
 Ranko Zidarić as Vasko Petrovich
 Derek Hoxby as Thomas Hoffman
 Branko Blače as Munoz
 Robert Bobinac as Porter
 Budimar Sobat as Mitchell
 Ray Armstrong as Wolfgang Kranz
 Ivo Krištof as Captain Carl Ludwig
 Peter Arp as SS Captain
 Damir Šaban as SS Sergeant
 Slavko Juraga as Partisan
 Milan Plećaš as Bulgarian Fascist

The Dirty Dozen
 Joseph Stern (Hunt Block) - unsentenced; Stern is back in prison after assaulting an officer in a bar. He's skeptical of re-joining the 'dirty dozen' at first, but later joins the rest of the men in line at roll call.
 Dravko Demchuk (Alex Cord) - sentenced to hang; a former train operator in Yugoslavia turned train robber. His expertise regarding trains is vital to the mission.
 Carmine D'Agostino (Erik Estrada) - sentenced to hang; D'Agostino was a former "hotshot syndicate hitman."
 Fred Collins (John Matuszak) - unsentenced; along with Tom Ricketts, he was arrested on Major Wright's orders after brawling outside a Liverpool pub. Known for his great hand-to-hand fighting ability and his "great left hand."
 Tom Ricketts (Ray Mancini) - unsentenced; nicknamed "Shorty" by best friend Fred Collins. Like his friend, possesses great hand-to-hand combat ability.
 Joseph Hamilton (Ernie Hudson) - sentenced to hang; African-American soldier who killed his white French wife after she was unfaithful. Hamilton broke out of his cell, scaled a guard tower and seized control of a machine gun before Major Wright talked him down.
 Thomas Hoffman (Derek Hoxby) - sentenced to 50 years hard labor; fluent in German, Hoffman had traveled in Europe for years and his familiarity with Yugoslavia made him an important member of the dozen.
 Lonnie Wilson (James Carroll Jordan) - sentenced to 40 years hard labor.
 Roberto Echevarria (Richard Yniguez) - sentenced to 50 years hard labor; a bank robber with gangland ties, Echevarria was caught and disarmed by Major Wright after stealing Wright's trench knife at the training site.
 The other three members of the dozen are Munoz (Branko Blače), Porter (Robert Bobinac) and Mitchell (Budimar Sobat), but only Munoz has any dialogue.

References

External links
 
 
 

1988 television films
1988 films
1980s English-language films
Films directed by Lee H. Katzin
Television sequel films
American action television films
War adventure films
Films set on trains
War films set in Partisan Yugoslavia
World War II films based on actual events
Films set in Axis-occupied Greece
Films shot in Croatia
American World War II films
Films about the United States Army
1980s American films
World War II television films